Thomas Brodrick may refer to:

 Thomas Brodrick (1654–1730), Irish MP
 Thomas Brodrick (Royal Navy officer) (died 1769), British naval officer

See also
Brodrick Thomas (disambiguation)